Asperitas inquinata is a species of air-breathing land snail, a terrestrial gastropod mollusk in the family Dyakiidae. This species has two subspecies: Asperitas inquinata moussoni and Asperitas inquinata penidae.

This snail is found in Indonesia and Bali, with the subspecies A. inquinata penidae being found also on Penida Island.

References

Dyakiidae
Gastropods described in 1842